That Man of Mine is an American film released in 1946. Directed by Leonard Anderson, it features an African-American cast.

According to the New York Times, the all female group The International Sweethearts of Rhythm features in   "several" soundies that were "culled" from the film.

Cast
Ruby Dee as Joan
Harrel Tillman
Powell Lindsay as Sid 
Tommie Moore as Honey Diamond (previously known as Jenny)
Flo Hawkins as Nicky
Rhina Harris
Berty Haynes
Ruth Dubois
Kenneth Broomes as Dancer
Billie and Millie as Dancers
The International Sweethearts of Rhythm
Anna Mae Winburn
Henri Woode

Music
Several songs are included in the film: "Breaking My Heart" by Joe Liggins, "How About That Jive" by Tiny Davis, "Jam Session", "Don't Get It Twisted", "Vi Vigor", "The Thing", "Standing Room Only", "That Man of Mine" by Maurice King (musician), "Woode Would" by Bob MacRae, "It's Just Like That", "Dear One" by Henri Woode, Marion Marlowe.

See also
Race film

References

Further reading

1946 films
African-American films
American musical films
1940s American films